Trichosirocalus horridus is a species of true weevils, native to Europe. It is a biological pest control agent that was introduced into the United States in 1974 to control exotic thistles, especially in the Cirsium and Carduus genera.

Life history 
T. horridus feeds on the rosettes of thistles, with the larvae causing most damage to the plant.

Nontarget impacts 
In 2004, T. horridus was observed feeding on the native thistle Cirsium altissimum L. in Nebraska. The weevil was observed on the native thistle at about the same rate as the targeted invasive thistle (Cirsium vulgare). T. horridus has also been observed feeding on 5 native Cirsium species in Tennessee.

References

Further reading
 

Ceutorhynchini
Beetles of Europe
Insects used for control of invasive plants
Biological pest control beetles
Beetles described in 1801